Marcelo Navajas Salinas (born ) is a Bolivian surgeon and pulmonologist. He was the Bolivian Minister of Health from 8 April to 20 May 2020 under the government of interim president Jeanine Áñez. Navajas took over after the resignation minister Aníbal Cruz.

References 

1957 births
Living people
Bolivian pulmonologists
Health ministers of Bolivia